Gliese 251, also known as HIP 33226 or HD 265866, is a star located about 18 light years away from the Solar System. Located in the constellation of Gemini, it is the nearest star in this constellation. It is located near the boundary with Auriga, 49 arcminutes away from the bright star Theta Geminorum; due to its apparent magnitude of +9.89 it cannot be observed with the naked eye. The closest star to Gliese 251 is QY Aurigae, which is located 3.5 light years away.

Gliese 251 is a red dwarf with a spectral type of M3V with an effective temperature of about 3300 K. Its mass has been measured to be around 0.36 solar masses and its radius is about 36% solar radii. Its metallicity is likely slightly less than that of the Sun. Observations at infrared wavelengths rule out the presence of a circumstellar disk around it.

Planetary system

In 2019, two candidate planets were detected by the radial velocity method to orbit Gliese 251 at orbits of 1.74 and 607 days. However, a new study in 2020 using CARMENES data refuted both candidates, as they found that both signals were caused by stellar activity. Based on the CARMENES data, the team announced that Gliese 251 is orbited by one single super-Earth (Gliese 251 b) at an orbit of 14.238 days.

References

Notes

Gemini (constellation)
M-type main-sequence stars
265866
0251
J06544902+3316058
033226
Planetary systems with one confirmed planet
TIC objects